Santa Rita Airport  is an airstrip  northwest of Casablanca, a city in the Valparaíso Region of Chile.

There is rising terrain north and west of the runway.

See also

Transport in Chile
List of airports in Chile

References

External links
OpenStreetMap - Santa Rita
OurAirports - Santa Rita
FallingRain - Santa Rita Airport

Airports in Chile
Airports in Valparaíso Region